The Mayor can refer to:

Fred Hoiberg, a basketball player and coach nicknamed "The Mayor"
The Mayor (1997 film), an Italian film
The Mayor (2017 film), a South Korean film
The Mayor (The PowerPuff Girls), a character in the animated television series
The Mayor (TV series), an American television sitcom
The Mayors, a 2004 Nigerian drama film written, produced and directed by Dickson Iroegbu
"The Mayor", a song by Hieroglyphics from the 2013 album The Kitchen

See also
 Mayor (disambiguation)
 He's the Mayor, a 1986 American sitcom
 She's the Mayor, a 2011 Canadian sitcom
 The Best Mayor, The King, a play by Lope de Vega
 The Chinese Mayor, a 2014 documentary film about Datong mayor Geng Yanbo
 The Mayor From Ireland, a 1912 American silent film produced by Kalem Company
The Mayor of 44th Street, a 1942 film directed by Alfred E. Green
"The Mayor of Candor Lied", a 1976 song by Harry Chapin
The Mayor of Casterbridge, an 1886 novel by Thomas Hardy, which has been the subject of several adaptations
The Mayor of Hell, an American film starring James Cagney
The Mayor of MacDougal Street, a 2005 compilation album by Dave Van Ronk
The Mayor of Oyster Bay, a 2002 English film
 The Mayor of Zalamea, a play by Pedro Calderón de la Barca (1600–1681), which has been adapted for several films
 The Mayor's Nest, a 1932 British comedy film directed by Maclean Rogers